The N2 road is one of the national roads of Senegal. It connects the west and the east of the country in a large arc following the northern frontier from the outskirts of the capital Dakar via Thiès, Louga, Saint-Louis, Richard Toll, Thilogne, Ouro Sogui, Kidira and Nayé on the border with Mali.

See also
 N1 road
 N3 road
 N4 road
 N5 road
 N6 road
 N7 road
 Transport in Senegal

Road transport in Senegal